Laney College Football Stadium is a multi-purpose stadium located on the Laney College campus in Oakland, California on the former site of Frank Youell Field. It is owned and operated by Laney College and is the home field of the Laney Eagles track & field and football teams, both of which are part of the California Community College Athletic Association (CCCAA). The stadium is also the home field of the Oakland Roots SC soccer team of the USL Championship. For Roots games, the pitch is widened using a modular turf system. The stadium has room for up to 5,500+ with standing room.

Notable Events

Notes

References

Laney College
Buildings and structures in Oakland, California
History of Oakland, California
Soccer venues in California
USL Championship stadiums
Former National Independent Soccer Association stadiums
Sports venues in Oakland, California
High school football venues in California